Cross Roads Presbyterian Church and Cemetery and Stainback Store are historic buildings near Mebane, Alamance County, North Carolina. The church was built in 1876, and is a 1 1/2-story, brick vernacular church building. The Stainback Store, across from the church, was built about 1888, and is a simple two-story gable front frame structure built from materials of the original church building and session house from about 1792. Located near the church is the contributing cemetery established about 1792.

It was added to the National Register of Historic Places in 1984.

References

External links
 
 

Presbyterian churches in North Carolina
Cemeteries on the National Register of Historic Places in North Carolina
Protestant Reformed cemeteries
Churches on the National Register of Historic Places in North Carolina
Churches completed in 1876
19th-century Presbyterian church buildings in the United States
Churches in Mebane, North Carolina
National Register of Historic Places in Alamance County, North Carolina